Krasilnikoviella is a genus from the family Promicromonosporaceae.

References

Further reading 
 

Micrococcales
Bacteria genera